T. Chowdaravaripalli is a village in Brahmamgarimatham mandal, YSR district, Andhra Pradesh, India.

References

Villages in Kadapa district